Tricharia is a genus of lichens in the family Gomphillaceae. It has an estimated 30 species.

Species
Tricharia atrocarpa  
Tricharia aulaxiniformis 
Tricharia cretea 
Tricharia duotela 
Tricharia elegans 
Tricharia floridensis 
Tricharia gilva 
Tricharia helminthospora 
Tricharia hyalina 
Tricharia kashiwadanii 
Tricharia lancicarpa 
Tricharia livida 
Tricharia longispora 
Tricharia membranula 
Tricharia nigriuncinata 
Tricharia novoguineensis 
Tricharia oaxacae 
Tricharia pallida 
Tricharia paraguayensis 
Tricharia praecox 
Tricharia pseudosantessonii 
Tricharia santessoniana 
Tricharia santessonii 
Tricharia similis 
Tricharia sipmanii 
Tricharia sublancicarpa 
Tricharia subumbrosa 
Tricharia tuckerae 
Tricharia urceolata 
Tricharia vainioi 
Tricharia variratae

References

Ostropales
Lichen genera
Ostropales genera
Taxa named by Antoine Laurent Apollinaire Fée